The Lindenwood Lady Lions women represent Lindenwood University in CHA women's ice hockey during the 2017-18 NCAA Division I women's ice hockey season.

Offseason

Recruiting

Standings

Roster

2017–18 Lady Lions

Schedule

|-
!colspan=12 style=" "| Regular Season

|-
!colspan=12 style=" "|CHA Tournament

Awards and honors

Jolene deBruyn and Tayor Girard were named First Team CHA All-Stars, while Sierra Burt earned honors in the All-Rookie team.

References

Lindenwood
Lindenwood Lions women's ice hockey seasons
Lindenwood
Lindenwood